Gorra is a surname. Notable people with the surname include:
 Giulio Gorra (1832–1884), Italian painter
 Guy Maganga Gorra (born 1993), Gabonese sprinter
 Michael Gorra (born 1957), American professor of English and literature
 Patrick Gorra (born 1955),  Belgium